Efraín Amezcua  (3 August 1907 - 19 September 1970) was a Mexican football midfielder who made two appearances for the Mexico national team at 1930 FIFA World Cup.

References

External links

Mexico international footballers
1930 FIFA World Cup players
Footballers from Guanajuato
Sportspeople from León, Guanajuato
Mexican footballers
Association football midfielders
1907 births
1970 deaths